This is a list of artistic depictions of dyslexia.

Books

Children's literature
Maeve Kaplan-Taylor, one of the five main characters in the Beacon Street Girls series, is dyslexic.
Hank Zipzer, the main character in the eponymous children's series by American Actor Henry Winkler and children's literature author Lin Oliver is dyslexic.
Percy Jackson - Percy Jackson & the Olympians series of books
Annabeth Chase - Percy Jackson & the Olympians series of books
All of the Demigods - Percy Jackson & the Olympians and Heroes of Olympus series of books with some exceptions, namely Frank Zhang and Will Solace.
Mavis Elizabeth Betterly (May), the main character from Caroline Starr Rose's novel in verse May B, must leave school partly due to her dyslexia, which sets in motion the events of the story.

Novels
Maggie  in Jennifer Weiner's novel, In Her Shoes (2002) is dyslexic. The novel was adapted to film (In Her Shoes) in 2005.
Jackie Flowers, a detective and lawyer in a series of detective novels by mystery writer, Stephanie Kane, is dyslexic.
Will Trent, who is a Georgia Bureau of Investigation detective in Karin Slaughter's novels, is dyslexic.
Bascule the Teller, a character from Iain M Banks' novel Feersum Endjinn, is dyslexic.  Bascule's portion of the story is narrated in a semi-phonetic spelling that non-dyslexic readers may find difficult to parse, perhaps yielding insight into a dyslexic's world.
Stella Penn, character from Mark Peter Hughes' 'Lemonade Mouth'. Found out she has Dyslexia at the end of the book.
Wylan Van Eck, a character from the Six of Crows series by Leigh Bardugo, is dyslexic.

Comic books
Moose Mason in Archie Comics is dyslexic.
 Taki Matsuya, a mutant character from Marvel Comics, (1988–present), is dyslexic.
Cassandra Cain, a previous version of the super-hero Batgirl, is dyslexic, sort of. From birth she is taught to read the world in movement, as a plan to make her an unstoppable martial artist.  She has appeared in comic books published by DC Comics since 1999.

Film

Children's films
2007 Indian film, Taare Zameen Par, tells the story of Ishaan (Darsheel Safary) who struggles greatly in school until an art teacher (Aamir Khan) determines that he has dyslexia.
2010 American film, Percy Jackson & the Olympians: The Lightning Thief, a film about Greek mythology existing in the 21st Century, based on the series by Rick Riordan, the main character, Percy Jackson is dyslexic. To Demigods, it is a learning disability and an advantage to them at the same time. It jumbles up the words needed for their schoolwork but it also allows them to translate ancient Greek as their brains are hardwired for it. Percy's dyslexia is caused by his divine blood, which hardwires his brain to read only Ancient Greek.

General
1997 British film, Shooting Fish: Dylan (Dan Futterman) Is a conman who attributes his lifestyle to his unemployable nature which he puts down to his dyslexia. 
2001 American film, Pearl Harbor: Captain Rafe McCawley (Ben Affleck) 
2004 American independent film, Mean Creek tells the story of a group of boys who must contend with the school bully, a dyslexic boy named George (Josh Peck). Eventually, as George's mask disintegrates, he becomes the victim of the group.
2004 Canadian film, Wilby Wonderful:  Duck MacDonald (Callum Keith Rennie)
2005 French film, La Cérémonie: Sophie (Sandrine Bonnaire)
2005 American film, In Her Shoes: Maggie (Cameron Diaz). It is based upon Jennifer Weiner's 2002 novel, In Her Shoes.
2006 British film,  A Mind of Her Own tells the story of a dyslexic woman, Sophie, who is determined to become a doctor.
2009 American film, Dislecksia: The Movie, a documentary film

Made-for-television films

Children's films
1984 American ABC Afterschool Special, Backwards: The Riddle of Dyslexia tells the story of Brian (River Phoenix) who struggles in school until he is determined to be dyslexic.

General
1981 American television movie, The Princess and the Cabbie tells the story of a wealthy young woman, Joanna (Valerie Bertinelli), who is sheltered by her father until a cab driver realizes that she is dyslexic and tries to help her.
1985 American television movie, Love, Mary is based on the true story of Mary (Kristy McNichol) who is determined to be dyslexic by a counselor in an institution and  eventually becomes a doctor.
1992 American television movie, The Secret tells the story of Mike (Kirk Douglas) who has hidden dyslexia his entire life until he realizes that his grandson Jesse faces the same difficulties.
1999 American television movie, Anya's Bell: Scott (Mason Gamble)

Television series

Children's shows
1996–present American television series, Arthur: George Lundgren
2000-2004 American animated television series Static Shock: Rubberband Man (voiced by Kadeem Hardison)
2001–present Canadian television series, Degrassi: The Next Generation: The characters Joey Jeremiah and Anya MacPherson  
2014–2016 British television series, Hank Zipzer: Hank Zipzer (Nick James), based on the children's literature book series Hank Zipzer by Henry Winkler and Lin Oliver.
2018 Canadian television series, The Ponysitters Club: The Ponysitters Club (Skye).

General
1984–1992 American television series,  The Cosby Show: Theodore Huxtable (Malcolm-Jamal Warner)
1994–1995 American television series,  My So Called Life: Jordan Catalano (Jared Leto)
1994–1996 American television series,  seaQuest DSV: Seaman Anthony Piccolo (Michael DeLuise)
1990–2000 American television series,  Beverly Hills, 90210: Donna Martin (Tori Spelling)
1991–1998 American television series,  Step by Step: John Thomas "J.T." Lambert (Brandon Call) and Jean-Luc Rieupeyroux (Bronson Pinchot)
2002–2007 American television series, George Lopez (TV series): Max. George Lopez (fictional character on the series) is portrayed as having dyslexia, which he inherited from his father George.
2005–present American television series, It's Always Sunny in Philadelphia: Charlie Kelly 
2006–2010 American television series, Heroes: The telepathic character Matt Parkman (Greg Grunberg)
2004–present American television series, Grey's Anatomy: Cristina Yang (Sandra Oh)
2007–present Australian television series, The Librarians: Lachie Davis (Josh Lawson)
2010–2013 American television series,  Shake It Up: CeCe Jones (Bella Thorne)
2010–present American television series,  Glee: Ryder Lynn (Blake Jenner)
2011–2019 American television series,  Game of Thrones: Jaime Lannister (Nikolaj Coster-Waldau)
2016–present British television series Victoria portrays Albert Edward, Prince of Wales (the future King Edward VII)  (Mac Jackson in Series 2, Laurie Shepherd in Series 3) as dyslexic, being unable as a child to distinguish a "y" from an "sh" and perceiving the words to "swim" on the page. As dyslexia was unknown in the 1840s, other characters, including his father Albert, Prince Consort, attribute his difficulty reading to a lack of effort or intelligence.
2018–present American television series, Star Trek: Discovery: Spock (Ethan Peck), mentioned in Season 2 of the show as having L'tak Torai, "a spatial and order dysphasia, much like dyslexia."

Notes

References
Goodnow, Cecelia. "Author Winkler turned the tables on dyslexia". Seattle Post-Intelligencer, May 17, 2007. 
Lakshmi, Rama. "The Pain of Dyslexia, As Told by Bollywood: Film on Disability Raises Awareness About Touchy Issue." The Washington Post, June 4, 2008.
Naithani, Ambika. "Taare Zameen Par inspires people, institutions into action." Economic Times. April 12, 2008.

External links
Children with Dyslexia in Fiction
Victor Widell's Dyslexia Simulation